Arna Wendell Bontemps House is located in Alexandria, Louisiana.  On October 13, 1902, author Arna Wendell Bontemps was born there.

It was the childhood home of Arna Wendell Bontemps.

Avoiding demolition due to construction of Interstate 49, the house was moved six blocks, in 1991.  And it was then renovated.

It was added to the National Register of Historic Places on September 13, 1993.

References

Houses on the National Register of Historic Places in Louisiana
Houses in Alexandria, Louisiana
National Register of Historic Places in Rapides Parish, Louisiana